The Lohner Type AA (a.k.a. Lohner 10.20, 10.20A, 10.20B, 111.01, 111.02, 111.03, Lohner Dr.I and Lohner D.I) were a series of prototype fighters built during World War I. The program would eventually be cancelled due to inherent instability concerns of the design.

Design and development
 
In 1916 the manufacturing company Lohner-Werke of Vienna was given a contract from the Luftfahrttruppen to design and build a single seat fighter based around the  Austro-Daimler six-cylinder inline engine.
Work was begun on the first airframe, serial number 111.01, and on 5 September 1916 the Lohner 10.20 was unveiled at Aspern. It was a single-bay biplane with equal-span wings and I-type struts. The empennage incorporated a conventional horizontal stabilizer with no vertical stabilizer and  an abbreviated all-moving rudder. The fuselage was short and deep of laminated wood construction, armed with twin synchronized Schwarzlose machine guns.
 
During taxi trials, insufficient yaw control was reported with a tendency to "swap ends". A larger rudder was installed and the fuselage lengthened from 4.65m (15 ft 3in) to 5.85m (19 ft 2in).
The Lohner 10.20 first flew on 29 December 1916 and exhibited poor stability. Further test flights followed and the prototype was severely damaged when it crashed in February 1917.

The fighter was sent back to the Lohner-Werke factory where repairs and extensive modification were completed. Now referred to as the Lohner 10.20A, the fuselage was again lengthened to 6.35m (20 ft 10in), the I type struts were replaced with the more common twin struts with wire braces. The tail was completely redesigned with a fixed vertical fin and an even larger rudder. Flight testing of the 10.20A continued until 6 June 1917, when it was totally destroyed in another crash.
 
The second fighter prototype built was serial number 111.02, called the 10.20B. Tail surfaces were similar to the 10.20A and a deep dorsal fin was added. The I-type wing struts returned, reinforced by inclined V-struts. Its initial flight was at Aspern on 2 June 1917. In August 1917 the Luftfahrttruppen commandeered 10.02B and official trials continued through October when further development of this airframe ended.

The third airframe built was known only as 111.03. The I-type struts were again dropped in favor of the twin struts with wire braces and in an effort to gain directional stability the dorsal fin became even more pronounced. First flown on 28 June 1917, flight testing continued through October. Due to the lackluster performance, further development was halted and the Luftfahrttruppen assigned  Lohner-Werke a licence to produce the Aviatik (Berg) D.I.

A triplane version of the 111.03 was built as the Lohner Dr.I / Type A / 111.04.

Variants
Data from:Austro-Hungarian Army Aircraft of World War One
Type A Company designation for the 111.04 / Dr.I triplane.
Type AA company designation for a 1916 fighter; four prototypes ordered.
Lohner 10.20 Luftfahrtruppen designation for the first prototype, with single I-section inter-plane struts, first flown on 29 December 1916.
Lohner 10.20A the first prototype modified with more conventional twin inter-plane struts and longer fuselage, first flight 4 March 1917.
Lohner 10.20B The second aircraft, which was much revised, reprising the I-section inter-plane struts. The fuselage had a long dorsal fin running from the cockpit back to the fin.
Lohner 111.01Later Luftfahrtruppen designation for the 10.20A.
Lohner 111.02Later Luftfahrtruppen designation for the 10.20B.
Lohner 111.03 Luftfahrtruppen designation for the third aircraft, with twin inter-plane struts.
Lohner 111.04 Triplane version of the 111.03, first flown on 7 July 1917.
Lohner D.I A generic military designation for all of the above
Lohner Dr.I A generic military designation for the 111.04

Specifications (Type AA / D.I / 111.03)

See also

References

Lohner aircraft
1910s Austro-Hungarian fighter aircraft
Military aircraft of World War I
Biplanes
Single-engined tractor aircraft
Aircraft first flown in 1916